Mani Magudam is a 1966 Indian Tamil language film, directed by S. S. Rajendran and written by M. Karunanidhi. The film stars Rajendran, C. R. Vijayakumari, Jayalalithaa,and M. N. Nambiar. Based on Karunanidhi's play of the same name, it was released on 9 December 1966.

Plot 

A group of revolutionaries from Manimagudapuram raise a revolt against their king and try to establish democracy in their kingdom. However, they do not know that their king is a kindhearted man.

Cast 

S. S. Rajendran as King Mani Maaran/Puthumai Pithan
C. R. Vijayakumari as Alli
Jayalalitha as Poongodi/Kalarani
M. N. Nambiar as Raja Guru/Veera Mahendran
S. A. Natarajan as Diwan Gunaselar
Manorama as Vanchi
A. Karunanidhi as Ulagappan, Vanchi's brother
O. A. K. Thevar as Ponnazhagan,
"En Thangai" Natarajan
R. V. Udayappa as Marutheeran
N. S. K. Kolappan as Azhangappan
S. V. Sahasranamam in Guest appearance
Nagesh as Anandhan in Guest appearance

Production 
Mani Magudam is based on Karunanidhi's play of the same name. While Rajendran, the lead actor of the play, reprised his role in the film adaptation, Manorama was replaced by Vijayakumari as the lead actress.<ref>{{Cite web |date=25 July 2017 |title=கே.பாலசந்தரின் "தாமரை நெஞ்சம்{{}} விஜயகுமாரிக்கு பதில் சரோஜாதேவி நடித்தார் |url=https://www.maalaimalar.com/Cinema/CineHistory/2017/07/25215430/1098503/cinima-history-vijayakumari.vpf |url-status=live |archive-url=https://web.archive.org/web/20190601054010/https://www.maalaimalar.com/Cinema/CineHistory/2017/07/25215430/1098503/cinima-history-vijayakumari.vpf |archive-date=1 June 2019 |access-date=13 July 2022 |website=Maalai Malar |language=ta}}</ref>

 Soundtrack 
The music was composed by R. Sudarsanam.

 Reception Kalki'' noted that, among the three roles portrayed by Rajendran, only the insane one was worth applauding.

References

External links 
 

1960s Tamil-language films
1966 films
Films scored by R. Sudarsanam
Films with screenplays by M. Karunanidhi
Indian films based on plays